Zephani Idoko (born 17 March 1994) is an actress best known for her starring role as Abena in Horror film The Unsettling and her supporting role as Sallay in Nikyatu Jusu's Nanny, which won the top award (The Grand Jury Prize) at the 2022 Sundance Film Festival. She also plays Stephanie on the Starz show Power book II: Ghost and Ashley on HBO Max's Gossip Girl

Personal life 
Zephani Idoko was born in Lagos, Nigeria to parents Deborah and John Idoko as the youngest of six siblings. After moving to the United States, she earned a BFA degree studying Acting under Diane Baker at the Academy Of Art in San Francisco, California. Idoko began working as an actor and model while still an undergraduate. She met her husband during her time in San Francisco and the two were married 4 years later in 2019, and now live in New York City.

Career 
Shortly after her graduation and move to New York City, She was cast in the starring role of Abena in the independent psychological horror film The Unsettling which screened at international film festivals in Australia, The UK and The US in 2021 and 2022  l before its release on February 10 2023 in select theaters and on Apple TV+, Prime Video and other streaming platforms. Idoko's most recent TV appearances are in the recurring role of Stephanie in Starz show Power Book II: Ghost and her role in the 2nd season of HBO Max's Gossip Girl.

In June 2021, it was announced that Idoko was cast in the supporting role of Sallay in Blumhouse and Amazon Studios' psychological Horror film, Nanny, Which Premiered at Sundance Film Festival 2022 and won the Grand Jury Prize in the dramatic competition. Idoko has discussed the film and her career in a number of interviews, including her feature in Photobook Magazine. and with OkayAfrica Nanny screened in the Special Presentations category at TIFF in September 2022 and at several other festivals including BFI London Film Festival, AFI FEST and AFRIFF in Lagos Nigeria, where Idoko was born. Nanny was released in movie theaters November 23, 2022, followed by a Prime Video streaming release on December 16, 2022.

Filmography

Film

Television

References

External links 

 Zephani Idoko at IMDb
 https://zephaniidoko.com

1994 births
Living people
American film actresses
Actresses from San Francisco
American television actresses
African-American actresses
American people of Nigerian descent
21st-century American actresses
Residents of Lagos
21st-century African-American women